Dávid Vojvoda (born 4 September 1990) is a Hungarian professional basketball player who currently plays for Alba Fehérvár of the Hungarian Nemzeti Bajnokság I/A.

External links
Dávid Vojvoda player profile, stats, bio on Eurobasket
Dávid Vojvoda career stats on the official website of the Hungarian Basketball Association
Dávid Vojvoda player profile, stats at FIBA Europe

1990 births
Living people
ABA League players
Alba Fehérvár players
Atomerőmű SE players
Hungarian men's basketball players
Kaposvári KK players
Lega Basket Serie A players
Pallacanestro Reggiana players
People from Kaposvár
Shooting guards
Small forwards
Szolnoki Olaj KK players
ZTE KK players
Sportspeople from Somogy County